Serinicoccus chungangensis is a Gram-positive and halophilic bacterium species from the genus Serinicoccus which has been isolated from tidal flat sediments from the Seogmo Island in Korea.

References 

Micrococcales
Bacteria described in 2011